Robert Henley (10 June 1851 – 21 March 1889) was an English first-class cricketer and British Army officer. 

The son of Cornish Henley, he was born at Sherborne in June 1851 and was educated there at Sherborne School. Henley was commissioned into the British Army when he purchased the rank of ensign into the King's Royal Rifle Corps in May 1870, with promotion to lieutenant following in November 1871. While garrisoned at Winchester, he played first-class cricket for Hampshire in 1875, making a single appearance against Kent at Winchester. He was absent hurt in Hampshire's first innings, but did bat in their second innings where he scored 14 runs before being dismissed by George Remnant. He also bowled three overs in the Kent first innings, without taking a wicket. In the King's Royal Rifle Corps, he was promoted to captain in October 1880, before being promoted to major in June 1885. Henley died suddenly on 21 March 1889 at his residence in Ovington, Hampshire. His elder brother, Anthony, was also a first-class cricketer, as was his nephew Francis Henley.

References

External links

1851 births
1889 deaths
People from Sherborne
Cricketers from Dorset
People educated at Sherborne School
King's Royal Rifle Corps officers
English cricketers
Hampshire cricketers